The Ministry for the Environment is a ministry of the State of Chile that is in charge of collaborating with the President of the Republic in the design and application of policies, plans and programs in environmental matters, as well as in the protection and conservation of biological diversity and of renewable and hydric natural resources, promoting sustainable development, the integrity of the environmental policy and its normative regulation.

This ministry was created in January 2010 to replace the National Environment Commission (Comisión Nacional del Medio Ambiente, CONAMA). The new ministry became operational on October 1st of that year.

Maisa Rojas has served as minister since 11 March 2022.

Background
From December 1990 to March 1994, the highest environmental authority was the Technical Secretariat of the National Environment Commission of the Ministry of National Assets, which would later become the National Environment Commission. The highest position of that Secretariat was held in all the period by Rafael Asenjo.

In March 1994, it was created the National Environmental Commission (CONAMA) through the Law on General Bases of the Environment (Law No. 19,300), being José Goñi its first CEO.

In 2007, it was created the position of President of the National Environmental Commission, granting him the rank of Minister of State. Thus, Ana Lya Uriarte was the first Minister President of that Commission.

List of representatives

References

External links
 

Government ministries of Chile